Tarasgaon is a village in the Kanker district (North Baster) of Chhattisgarh state, central India. The 2011 Census of India recorded 1,437 inhabitants in this town.

See also
 Kanker district

References

Villages in Kanker district